Bolshoye Yesiplevo is a rural locality (a village) in Krasavinskoye Rural Settlement, Velikoustyugsky District, Vologda Oblast, Russia. The population was 11 as of 2002.

Geography 
Bolshoye Yesiplevo is located 20 km northeast of Veliky Ustyug (the district's administrative centre) by road. Vasilyevskoye is the nearest rural locality.

References 

Rural localities in Velikoustyugsky District